Presidency University, Bangalore is a private university located in Bangalore, Karnataka, India. The university offers courses in engineering, management, design, computer applications, commerce and law.

History
The university's founding Chairman and Chancellor is Nissar Ahmed; the Vice Chancellor is D. Shubakar.
It was chartered by the Presidency University Act (Karnataka State Act No. 41) in 2013. The university commenced classes in 2015.

References

External links 

Private universities in India
Universities in Bangalore
2013 establishments in Karnataka
Educational institutions established in 2013